Roger Federer was the defending champion but did not compete that year.

Nikolay Davydenko won in the final 6–4, 7–5 against Martin Verkerk.

Seeds

  Rainer Schüttler (quarterfinals)
  Paradorn Srichaphan (first round)
  Jiří Novák (second round)
  Martin Verkerk (final)
  Vince Spadea (second round)
  Andrei Pavel (first round)
  Taylor Dent (second round)
  James Blake (first round)

Draw

Finals

Top half

Bottom half

External links
 2002 BMW Open Singles draw

2004 ATP Tour
2004 BMW Open